Céline Meinecke-Cohen (born 5 March 1967) is a former professional tennis player from Switzerland.

Biography

Tennis career
Cohen, who grew up in Cartigny near Geneva, represented Switzerland in 11 Federation Cup ties, the first in 1986.

Her best performance in a grand slam tournament came at the 1988 Australian Open, where she made it to the round of 16. After beating Jill Hetherington to start her run, she won two close matches, over Catherine Suire 11–9 in the final set and then Lea Antonoplis 9–7 in the decider. She lost in the round of 16 to third seed Chris Evert.

She reached her career high singles ranking of 114 in the world in 1988. The following year she had a win over world number 17 Lori McNeil at the 1989 European Open held in Geneva. She retired from professional tennis after the 1991 season.

Personal life
Cohen is married to German tennis player Tore Meinecke and has three children. She is Jewish.

ITF finals

Doubles (0–2)

See also
List of select Jewish tennis players

References

External links
 
 
 

1967 births
Living people
Swiss female tennis players
Swiss Jews
Tennis players from Geneva
Jewish tennis players